Mir Afzal Khan (born 1923) is a Pakistani politician from the Khyber-Pakhtunkhwa province of Pakistan. He served as the 16th Chief Minister of the province from 7 August, 1990 to 19 July 1993.

Early life 
Afzal Khan was born to a wealthy family of landlords in Mardan, Khyber Pakhtunkhwa at the home of Sarfaraz Khan, who was well known politician from Mardan in then NWFP now Khyber Pakhtunkhwa. He was the brother of Begum Zari Sarfaraz, who was a politician and social worker.

See also 

 List of Chief Ministers of Khyber Pakhtunkhwa
 Khyber PakhtunKhwa

References

External links 
 Khyber-Pakhtunkhwa Provincial Government Abbas Sarfaraz, Mardan, Khyber-Pakhtunkhwa.

1923 births
2022 deaths
Pashtun people
Chief Ministers of Khyber Pakhtunkhwa
People from Mardan District
North-West Frontier Province MPAs 1990–1993